Thrifty may refer to:

 Thrifty Foods, a Canadian supermarket chain
 Thrifty Drug Stores and Thrifty PayLess, now Rite Aid
 Thrifty phenotype
 Thrifty Rent A Car, part of Dollar Thrifty Automotive Group

See also
Affluenza
Anti-consumerism
Conspicuous consumption
Downshifting (lifestyle)
Frugality
Mottainai
Over-consumption
Simple living
Thrift (disambiguation)
Thrift shop